Rejwan Ahammad Taufiq (born 27 October 1969) is a Bangladesh Awami League politician and the incumbent member of parliament from Kishoreganj-4.

Early life
Taufiq was born on 27 October 1969. He has a B.S.S. degree. His father is President of Bangladesh Abdul Hamid.

Career
Taufiq was elected to Parliament on 5 January 2014 from Kishoreganj-4 as a Bangladesh Awami League candidate.

References

Awami League politicians
Living people
1969 births
10th Jatiya Sangsad members
11th Jatiya Sangsad members